The Design and Industries Association is a United Kingdom charity whose object is to engage with all those who share a common interest in the contribution that design can make to the delivery of goods and services that are sustainable and enhance the quality of life for communities and the individual."

20th century
Shortly before the Great War there was a growing awareness, among British designers, of the extent to which German industrial design had taken the ideals of the Arts and Crafts movement (that had originated with William Morris and others in Britain in the late 19th century) and had successfully moved these into the age of mass, mechanised, production. The German Deutscher Werkbund organisation's Cologne exhibition, held before the outbreak of war in 1914, had been visited by many of those designers, architects, retailers and industrialists who were later to found the Design and Industries Association.

In March 1915 an exhibition of German manufactures was held at Goldsmiths' Hall in London. Shortly afterwards a meeting under the chairmanship of Lord Aberconway led to the foundation of the Design and Industries Association (DIA), with the express intention of raising the standard of British industrial design, under the slogan of "Fitness for Purpose".

DIA promoted its ideals through lectures, journals and exhibitions. Exhibitions included:

 1920 Household Things - Whitechapel Gallery, London
 1942 - 1945 Design Round The Clock - travelling
 1953 Register your Choice - Charing Cross Underground Station

The journals published varied through the period and included:

 1932 Design In Industry
 1933 - 1935 Design for Today
 1936 Trends in Everyday Life

In its early years there was considerable tension between the attachment of some members to the principals of the Arts and Crafts movement and the desire to promote the clearly 20th-century outlook of the Modern Movement.

Having been heavily involved with the British government's Utility Scheme in the Second World War, DIA had campaigned for the greater involvement of government in the promotion of good design. Ironically, DIA itself was to be somewhat eclipsed by the foundation of the government funded Council for Industrial Design, now the Design Council, in 1944.

DIA Today
Despite the predominance of the Design Council in the latter half of the 20th century, DIA continues its work today as an independent body, organising competitions, events and offering bursaries. In 1978 DIA, together with The Royal College of Art, The Faculty of Royal Designers for Industry and The Royal Academy of Engineering established the Sir Misha Black Awards to recognise excellence and innovation in design education.

Membership
DIA office bearers and members have included some of the most notable 20th-century British designers and manufacturers:

 Lord Aberconway
 Wenman Joseph Bassett-Lowke
 Sir Misha Black
 Cecil Brewer
 Noel Carrington
 Serge Ivan Chermayeff
 Harold Curwen
 Nanna Ditzel
 Ambrose Heal
 Charles Holden
 Minnie McLeish
 Harry Peach
 Nikolaus Pevsner
 Frank Pick
 Jack Pritchard
 Sir (Sydney) Gordon Russell
 George Wilson-Crowe
 Sir Lawrence Weaver
 Hamilton T Smith [first director of Heals, designer]

References
"Design and Industries Association." A Dictionary of Modern Design. Oxford University Press, 2004, 2005. Answers.com 13 Oct. 2008. http://www.answers.com/topic/design-and-industries-association

"Nothing Need Be Ugly", The first 70 years of the Design & Industries Association. Plumber, Raymond. DIA London 1985

External links
 The Design and Industries Association

Architecture groups
British art
Design institutions
Organizations established in 1915